Yiwu International Trade City, also known as the Yiwu Market, is the primary wholesale market complex in Yiwu, Zhejiang, China. According to the World Bank, it is the world's largest small commodities market. In 2013, the market sold US$11 billion of goods.

History
In the early 1980s, Yiwu was an impoverished rural county historically known for its small traders, who mostly bartered sugar for chicken feathers during the Qing dynasty. However, the Communist Party of China banned the practice as "capitalist activity" after taking power in 1949. Although the Chinese government initiated the reform and opening policy in 1978, selling things for profit by private citizens was still banned in practice.

In April 1982, Xie Gaohua was appointed Party Secretary of Yiwu. A month after his arrival, a street vendor named Feng Aiqian (冯爱倩) complained to him that her goods were repeatedly confiscated by county authorities and questioned why she was not allowed to sell goods to support her poor family. After their conversation, Xie travelled to Wenzhou, the first Chinese city to allow private enterprises, to conduct research, and decided that building a free market was compatible with national policies.

In September 1982, Xie announced the establishment of Huqingmen Market (湖清门市场) in Yiwu under the guideline of "four permissions": permissions for farmers to enter the city, to conduct business, to engage in long-haul trading, and to compete with both state enterprises and private individuals. This was the first time in the People's Republic of China that a local government legalized a free market for farmers.

When the market was opened in November 1982, it merely consisted of a few hundred sheds and stalls, but proved highly popular and grew quickly. In 1983, the county government spent 580,000 yuan (US$293,567) to build a new market consisting of booths. By the end of that year, there were more than 1,000 vendors selling over 3,000 products, most of them from outside of Yiwu.

In October 1984, Xie proposed a new development strategy for Yiwu, with market trading as its pillar industry. Although he was transferred out of the county soon afterwards, the Yiwu Market continued its rapid growth and was rebuilt and expanded multiple times. The number of market booths exceeded 10,000 in 1991. In 2005, the World Bank called it "the world's largest small commodities market", and by 2013, it attracted more than 20,000 customers daily from all over the world and sold US$11 billion of goods annually.

Layout

The market is divided into 5 districts covering an area of 4 million square meters for 75,000 booths where 100,000 suppliers exhibit 400,000 kinds of products. The products come from around 40 industries and include 2,000 different categories of goods.

Given its size and the variety of booths selling different items, the market is a vast labyrinth. A photographer documenting the market told CNN: "I spent a total of four days constantly walking around Yiwu and wouldn't say I got near to seeing all of the stalls."

District 1
Initial construction of the first complex of the market began in 2001 and was opened on 22 October 2002.  District 1 covers an area of  hosting 9000 booths and over 10500 businesses. The complex cost ¥700 million to construct.

District 2

District 3/4
Work on the complex was constructed in two phases. The first phase finished in October 2008, while the second phase was completed on 21 October 2008. The building provides room for 14,000 booths.

District 5

References

Further reading
 , and an accompanying "Yiwu mall" video

External links
"The Streets of China Commodity City" - Photo series of market published in the New Yorker

Retail markets in China
Yiwu